Tony Magnusson (born February 23, 1963) is a Swedish semi-retired professional skateboarder and part-owner of Osiris Shoes. Magnusson gained significant fame throughout the 1980s by inventing several tricks and becoming one of the first professional skateboarders to start a rider-owned company.

Youth
Magnusson was born in the municipality of Tyresö, located in the city of Stockholm, Sweden. He started skateboarding at the age of 12 on a Newporter skateboard, when skateboarding was still considered "a fad". Magnusson turned 16 and had to decide whether he wanted to go to college or continue skateboarding.

Professional career 
Magnusson started his career as a rider in the United States for the Uncle Wiggley team in 1983.

After several years, Magnusson and his friend Mike Ternasky would form the H-Street skateboarding company, and would consult with skateboarding industry leader George Hamad to help with its daily operation. Magnusson was fond of the Powell Peralta videos, but did not have the budget to film the videos that they did. Instead, Ternasky and Magnusson agreed to edit the videos at home and sign some of the era's most innovative skaters to the team. Names like Ron Allen, Matt Hensley, and a fourteen-year-old Danny Way.

His company would shoot some of the most popular skateboarding videos in the 1980s. Shackle Me Not was considered to be a turning point as to how skateboarding videos were made, and the 1989 release of Hokus Pokus featured new team members Brian Lotti, Colby Carter, and Sal Barbier. Magnusson would go on to release five different videos under the H-Street name.

Magnusson was also an innovator on board design. He would design a concept called the "Hell Concave", which is a deep concave that extended from the nose of the board to the tail. In a 1983 interview Magnusson described his first model as "a very light board that has just the right amount of flex in it. The construction is very complicated and I'm not skilled enough to explain the details."

H-Street later disbanded. and co-founder Mike Ternasky died in a car accident on May 17, 1994. After years of discussion, Magnusson and George Hamad resurrected the H-Street brand in 2008.

Other ventures 
Magnusson was also one of several people who founded Osiris Shoes. Osiris was founded in 1996, and continues to produce technical footwear that is worn by several professional skateboarders.

Other achievements 
Magnusson is a five time winner of the Legends of Skateboard World Championships, an event held in Germany that he won each year from 2001 to 2005. He also placed 5th in the Legends division of the 2009 X-Games.

References 

 https://web.archive.org/web/20130523034720/http://skately.com/library/people/mike-ternasky
 http://xgames.espn.go.com/skateboarding/article/8737171/the-original-plan-b-skateboards-team-honors-their-late-founder-mike-ternasky

External links 
 
 Osiris Shoes official site

1964 births
21st-century American businesspeople
Swedish skateboarders
American people of Swedish descent
Sportspeople from California
Living people
People from Del Mar, California
X Games athletes
Sportspeople from Stockholm